Tobias Zielony (born 1973) is a German photographer and short filmmaker, living in Berlin. He has made work about communities at the margins of society, such as young people. In 2015, Zielony's series on African refugees in Germany, the Citizen, co-represented the country at the Venice Biennale and was shortlisted for the Deutsche Börse Photography Foundation Prize. He had a mid-career retrospective at Museum Folkwang in Essen, Germany in 2021 and his work is held in the collection of Philadelphia Museum of Art.

Biography
Zielony was born in Wuppertal, Germany. From 1998 to 2001, he studied documentary photography at the University of Wales, Newport in Wales. From 2001 to 2006, he studied at the Academy of Fine Arts Leipzig. He now lives in Berlin.

Publications

Books by Zielony
Behind the Block. Leipzig: Institut für Buchkunst, 2004. .
Tobias Zielony. ; Universitätsverlag, Weimar, 2004. .
The Cast. Berlin: C/O Berlin; Deutscher Kunstverlag, 2007. .
Trona: Armpit of America. Leipzig: , 2008. .
Story / No Story. Ostfildern: Hatje Cantz, 2010. .
Manitoba. Leipzig: Spector, 2011. .
Jenny Jenny. Leipzig: Spector, 2013. .
Vele. Leipzig: Spector, 2014. .
The Fall. Leipzig: Spector, 2021. . Published on the occasion of a retrospective exhibition at Museum Folkwang. In English and German.

Films

Big Sexyland (2008) – 3 mins
The Deboard (2008) – 8 mins
Le Vele di Scampia (2009) – 9 mins
Der Brief (The Letter) (2013) – 5 mins
Kalandia Kustom Kar Kommandos (Dream Lover) (2014) – 4 mins
Al-Akrab (2014) – 7 mins
Tamil Stars (2016) – 9 mins
Alles (Chemnitz) (2002, 2017) –  6 mins
Maskirovka (2018) – 8 mins

Exhibitions

Solo exhibitions
Tobias Zielony. The Fall, Museum Folkwang, Essen, Germany, 2021. A mid-career retrospective of photography and video.

Group exhibitions
German pavilion, 55th Venice Biennale, Venice, Italy, 2015.

Awards
One of four shortlisted, Deutsche Börse Photography Foundation Prize, London, 2015 for the Citizen

Collections
Zielony's work is held in the following permanent collection:
Philadelphia Museum of Art, Philadelphia, Pennsylvania: 5 prints (as of 25 September 2022)

References

External links
Zielony's profile at Kow gallery, Berlin

Social documentary photographers
21st-century German photographers
Hochschule für Grafik und Buchkunst Leipzig alumni
Alumni of the University of Wales, Newport
Artists from Wuppertal
Living people
1973 births